Gary Scherer is a Republican member of the Ohio House of Representatives for the 92nd district, which includes Fayette County, as well as portions of Pickaway and Ross counties. He was appointed in April 2012 to replace Bob Peterson, who was appointed to the Ohio Senate.

Scherer has a degree in accounting from Ohio State University, and worked as an accountant and businessman before becoming a Representative. He is married with three children.

Scherer was term-limited following his fourth term, which concludes in 2020. He served as the Vice Chair of the Ways and Means Committee and was a member of the Finance Committee during his terms. He ran for Commissioner of Pickaway County, Ohio in 2020, defeated his primary opponent, and will advance to the general election unopposed.

Electoral history

Ohio House of Representatives

County Commissioner

References

Living people
Republican Party members of the Ohio House of Representatives
Ohio State University Fisher College of Business alumni
Year of birth missing (living people)
21st-century American politicians